Numberlink is a type of logic puzzle involving finding paths to connect numbers in a grid.

Rules
The player has to pair up all the matching numbers on the grid with single continuous lines (or paths). The lines cannot branch off or cross over each other, and the numbers have to fall at the end of each line (i.e., not in the middle).

It is considered that a problem is well-designed only if it has a unique solution and all the cells in the grid are filled, although some Numberlink designers do not stipulate this.

History
In 1897, a slightly different form of the puzzle was printed in the Brooklyn Daily Eagle, in a column by Sam Loyd. Another early, printed version of Number Link can be found in Henry Ernest Dudeney's book Amusements in mathematics (1917) as a puzzle for motorists (puzzle no. 252). This puzzle type was popularized in Japan by Nikoli as Arukone (アルコネ, Alphabet Connection) and Nanbarinku (ナンバーリンク, Number Link). The only difference between Arukone and Nanbarinku is that in Arukone the clues are letter pairs (as in Dudeney's puzzle), while in Nanbarinku the clues are number pairs.

, three books consisting entirely of Numberlink puzzles have been published by Nikoli.

Versions of this known as Wire Storm, Flow Free and Alphabet Connection have been released as apps for iOS, Android and Windows Phone.

Computational complexity
As a computational problem, finding a solution to a given Numberlink puzzle is NP-complete.
NP-completeness is maintained even if "zig-zag" paths are allowed. Informally, this means paths may have "unnecessary bends" in them (see the reference for a more technical explanation).

See also
List of Nikoli puzzle types

References

External links
Nikoli's English page on Numberlink
Online version of Numberlink in HTML5

Logic puzzles